Graun may refer to:

Graun im Vinschgau (Curon Venosta), a municipality in Italy
Carl Heinrich Graun (1704–1759), a German composer
Johann Gottlieb Graun (1703–1771), a German composer and violinist
A nickname for The Guardian, a UK newspaper, from "Grauniad"